Bang Your Head!!! is a heavy metal and hard rock festival held annually in Germany.

First held in 1996 as a one-day indoor event in the Stefan-Hartmann-Halle in Tübingen with a crowd of 600 people, Bang Your Head!!! has since moved to Balingen, growing into a multi-day event attracting 1,800 people in 1998, 18,000 people in 1999 and 20,000 in 2005. Acts that have performed at this festival include W.A.S.P., Dio, Motörhead, Deep Purple, and Twisted Sister.

Lineups

2014
Held on 11 and 12 July at Messegelände in Balingen, Germany.

Twisted Sister
Europe
Axel Rudi Pell & Friends
Anthrax
Sebastian Bach
Unisonic
Michael Schenker's Temple of Rock
Stryper
Obituary
Exodus
Rob Rock
Ektomorf
Kissin' Dynamite
Grave
Schirenc Plays Pungent Stench
Riot V
Delain
Omen
Warlord
Mad Max
Atlantean Kodex
Hirax
Evocation
The Exalted Piledriver
More
Accu§er
Vain
Warrant

Warm-up show on 10 July:
Grave Digger
Victory
Storm Warrior
Bullet
Dynamite

2009
Held on 26 and 27 June at Messegelände in Balingen, Germany.

Blind Guardian
Journey
W.A.S.P.
U.D.O.
Y&T
Lita Ford
Exodus
Sodom
Hardcore Superstar
Sacred Reich
Warrior
Primordial
Pink Cream 69
Voi Vod
Driver
Ross the Boss
Powerwolf
Kissin' Dynamite
Lȧȧz Rockit
Alestorm
Cloven Hoof
Hatstik

2008
Held on 27 and 28 June at Messegelände in Balingen, Germany.

Judas Priest
Queensrÿche
Saxon
Tramp's White Lion
Hardcore Superstar
Great White
Yngwie Malmsteen's Rising Force
Obituary
Rage
Grave Digger
Agent Steel
Tankard
Onslaught
Ensiferum
Korpiklaani
Lizzy Borden
Breaker
Týr
Age of Evil
Contracrash
Secrecy
Forbidden

2007
Held on 22 and 23 June at Messegelände in Balingen, Germany.

Heaven and Hell
Edguy
HammerFall
Amon Amarth
Amorphis
Archer Nation
Brainstorm
Dark Tranquillity
Evergrey
Finntroll
Girlschool
Mercenary
Mystic Prophecy
Nazareth
Powermad
Praying Mantis
Steelheart
Thunder
Vicious Rumors
Violent Storm
W.A.S.P.
Wolf

2006

Whitesnake
In Flames
Foreigner
Stratovarius
Helloween
Y&T
Quiet Riot
Rik Emmett
Jon Oliva's Pain
Unleashed
Death Angel
Exodus
Armored Saint
Flotsam and Jetsam
Vengeance
L.A. Guns
Leatherwolf
Victory
Count Raven
Powerwolf
Hellfueled

2005

Twisted Sister
Motörhead
Dio
Saxon
Doro
U.D.O.
Sebastian Bach
Gamma Ray
Nevermore
Krokus
Axel Rudi Pell
Destruction
Virgin Steele
Amon Amarth
Tankard
Candlemass
Jag Panzer
Morgana Lefay
Exciter
Nasty Savage
Vicious Rumors
Demon

+ 'Very special guests':
Mike Tramp's White Lion
Hanoi Rocks

2004

Iced Earth
Alice Cooper
Queensrÿche
Sebastian Bach
Gotthard
Testament
Children of Bodom
UFO
Anthrax
Magnum
Primal Fear
Death Angel
Blaze
Lillian Axe
Kingdom Come
Omen
Doomsword
Shok Paris
Angel
Ruffians
Ballistic
Cage
Majesty

2003

Twisted Sister
Dio
Thin Lizzy
HammerFall
U.D.O.
Sodom
Overkill
Hypocrisy
Y & T
Dokken
TNT
Annihilator
Masterplan
Amon Amarth
Brainstorm
Axxis
Pink Cream 69
Rob Rock
Bitch
Angel Witch
Destructor
Hirax

Warm-up show
Doomsword
Omen

2002

Slayer
Saxon
Halford
Nightwish
Doro
Fozzy
Gamma Ray
Nevermore
Rawhead Rexx
Iron Savior
Candlemass
Titan Force
Bonfire
Shakra
Jag Panzer
Vanden Plas
Rhapsody
Tankard
Rival
Mägo de Oz
S.A. Adams

Warm-up gig:
Titan Force
Wizard
Powergod

Aftershow:
Shadowkeep
Falconer

References

External links
Official website

Heavy metal festivals in Germany
Recurring events established in 1996
Culture of Baden-Württemberg